Caldwell County Schools is a school district in North Carolina.

Caldwell County Schools may also refer to:
 Caldwell County Schools (Kentucky), a school district in Kentucky

See also
Caldwell-West Caldwell Public Schools in Essex County, New Jersey